Bonaventure Mizidy was a candidate in the 2002 Republic of Congo Presidential election for the Republican and Liberal Party. He garnered 1% of the vote.

References

Further reading
Bonaventure Mizidy annonce son projet de «Révolution bleue»
Revue de la presse congolaise - semaine du 25 Février.
Première convention nationale ordinaire du parti M.i.s -Bonaventure Mizidy de nouveau, candidat à l’élection présidentielle

Republic of the Congo politicians
Living people
Year of birth missing (living people)